Tylosaurus  (from the ancient Greek  'protuberance, knob' + Greek  'lizard') is a genus of mosasaur, a large, predatory marine reptile closely related to modern monitor lizards and to snakes, from the Late Cretaceous.

History of study

Discovery and naming

Tylosaurus was the third new genus of mosasaur to be described from North America behind Clidastes and Platecarpus and the first in Kansas. The early history of the genus as a taxon was subject to complications spurred by the infamous rivalry between American paleontologists Edward Drinker Cope and Othniel Charles Marsh during the Bone Wars. The fossil, which remains in the same museum under the catalog number MCZ 4374, was recovered from a deposit of the Niobrara Formation located in the vicinity of Monument Rocks near the Union Pacific Railroad at Fort Hays, Kansas. Cope's first publication of the fossil was very brief and was named Macrosaurus proriger, the genus being a preexisting European mosasaur taxon. The specific epithet proriger means "prow-bearing", which is in reference to the specimen's unique prow-like elongated rostrum and is derived from the Latin word prōra (prow) and suffix -gero (I bear). In 1870, Cope published a more thorough description of MCZ 4374. Without explanation, he moved the species into another European genus Liodon and declared his original Macrosaurus proriger a synonym.

In 1871, Cope identified a second species of North American Liodon based on several vertebrae and limb fragments, which he named Liodon dyspelor. The fossils came to Cope under the label as having been collected by an army doctor named William B. Lyon at Fort McRae, New Mexico. However, a 1997 study led by David C. Parris of the New Jersey State Museum found that the chemical composition of the fossil did not match any known geological deposit in New Mexico and is instead identical to that of the Niobrara Formation; the study speculated from examinations of multiple letters between Lyon and the Smithsonian Institution that the Liodon dyspelor fossils were actually recovered from somewhere in Western Kansas and were mislabeled as being collected by Lyon in New Mexico (who was shipping a different fossil from Fort McRae around the same time) during transit. The type specimen of the taxon is split between two museums; some of the vertebrae went to Cope's American Museum of Natural History as AMNH 1580 while the rest were sent to the Smithsonian as USNM 41.

In 1872, Marsh argued that Liodon proriger and Liodon dyspelor are taxonomically distinct from the European genus and must be assigned a new one. Marsh also described a third species based on a partial skeleton he collected near the southern portion of the Smoky Hill River that is now in the Yale Peabody Museum as YPM 1268, which Marsh named Rhinosaurus micromus. Cope responded by arguing that Rhinosaurus was already a preoccupied synonym of Liodon. He disagreed with Marsh's arguments but proposed that in case Marsh was indeed correct, the genus name Rhamphosaurus should be used. Marsh later discovered that the taxon Rhamphosaurus was preoccupied as a genus of lizard named in 1843. As a result, he suggested a move to a newly erected genus named Tylosaurus. This name means "knob lizard" in another reference to the elongated rostrum characteristic of the genus. It is derived from the Latin tylos (knob) and Ancient Greek . Despite coining the new genus, Marsh never formally transferred the Rhinosaurus species to Tylosaurus; this was first done in 1873 by Joseph Leidy of the University of Pennsylvania by transferring Rhinosaurus proriger and Rhinosaurus dyspelor to Tylosaurus. Rhinosaurus micromus was formally transferred to the same genus in 1894 by John Campbell Merriam, a paleontologist of the University of Munich at the time.

Tylosaurus subsequently became the near-universally accepted genus for T. proriger, T. dyspelor, and T. micromus. An exception to this adoption was Cope, who refused to accept Marsh's new genus and continued to refer to its species as Liodon. Cope also insisted that Rhamphosaurus was not preoccupied, arguing that while it was indeed used as a genus of lizard, it was subsequently synonymized with other genera before 1872 and was thus a vacant taxon. Cope's persistence can be seen in his 1874 description of the fourth described species of Tylosaurus, which he named Liodon nepaeolicus. This type specimen of this species consists of a right lower jaw, a partial upper jaw, a quadrate bone, and a dorsal vertebra and was discovered by geologist Benjamin Franklin Mudge in an unspecified deposit of Cretaceous grey shale about a half-mile south of the Solomon River. The fossils are stored in the American Museum of Natural History under the catalog number AMNH 1565. The specific epithet nepaeolicus is in reference to the Nepaholla, the Native American name for the Solomon River. Liodon nepaeolicus was formally transferred to the genus Tylosaurus in Merriam's 1894 publication.

19th and 20th century developments

Early depictions

The earliest depictions of Tylosaurus can be traced back to Cope's 1870 description of MCZ 4374. He suggested that Tylosaurus was an "excessively elongate reptile" because four of the back tail vertebrae of the specimen were less than a fifth in diameter than one more proximal, or closer to, the base of the tail, and there was little dimensional variation between the four back tail vertebrae. To Cope, this indicated that the enormous decrease in the size of the tail vertebrae from the base to the tip of the tail was minimal between vertebrae; thus, in order for the vertebrae in the column to approach the size of the tail vertebrae based on the observed rate of size decrease per vertebrae, plentiful amounts of vertebrae would have been needed. By measuring the proportions of the change in dimensions between the vertebrae, Cope estimated that Tylosaurus had at minimum over sixty vertebrae between the described proximal tail vertebra and a hypothetical vertebra measuring half the diameter of the four back tail vertebrae. Cope speculated that there were even more tail vertebrae ahead of the proximal vertebra, justified by the small transverse process it possessed, which would increase the vertebral count in the tail to an unknown but monstrous amount. The resulting animal became that akin to an enormous sea serpent-like reptile reaching lengths rivaling that of the largest whales. In an 1872 publication, Cope described in detail his imagination of the appearance of Tylosaurus. He depicted the head as akin to a giant flat cone supporting eyes directed partially upwards that is capable of swallowing entire prey whole like a snake, with a loose and baggy pelican-like throat to allow entry of such prey. Like a whale, one pair of paddle-like flippers was described to be present in the animal and functional hind limbs were thought to be absent. The tail was imagined as long and flat, propelling Tylosaurus forward via an anguilliform locomotion. Cope estimated that T. proriger measured at minimum  in length. T. dyspelor was the largest species of the genus was also described as the longest of all reptiles. In 1874, Cope estimated that T. nepaeolicus was around one-third the length of T. proriger, which would translate to around  when using his 1872 estimates.

One of the earliest restorations of Tylosaurus comes from an illustration by a popular artist named Henry Worrall for paleontologist William E. Webb's 1872 fictional book Buffalo Land. This illustration, which is titled The sea which once covered the plains, represents one of the first paleoart of marine reptiles and pterosaurs from the Niobrara Formation. At the center of the illustration rises a giant Tylosaurus (identified as Liodon proriger). The appearance of this mosasaur was influenced by Cope, who was an acquaintance of Webb, as evidenced by its excessively elongated tail and serpentine appearance. Additionally, the Tylosaurus was given a rather long neck. Although not as long as those of plesiosaurs like Elasmosaurus, this detail would influence subsequent depictions of Tylosaurus in art.

Increased understanding and complete skeletons

Paleontologists began to understand Tylosaurus as scientists do today beginning with Samuel Wendell Williston's 1898 publication of a comprehensive study of the skeletal anatomy of Kansas mosasaurs, which among many things corrected many of the erroneous beliefs held by earlier paleontologists about Tylosaurus. A central component of the publication was a rigorous skeletal reconstruction of T. proriger, which was drawn by paleoartist Sydney Prentice under Williston's instructions. This reconstruction was almost entirely informed by three specimens in the collections of the University of Kansas Natural History Museum, but they nevertheless provided enough material to represent nearly an entire skeleton. These three specimens include one consisting of a posterior fragment of the skull and an "absolute complete series of vertebrae, connected from head to tip of tail" collected in an unspecified date by a fossil collector named Elias Putnam West (KUVP 1048); one containing a complete skull and cervical vertebrae collected in 1898 by colleague Handel T. Martin (KUVP 28705); and one collected in 1877 by university chancellor Francis H. Snow that contains a near-complete set of front paddles along with some ribs, vertebrae, and shoulder girdles (KUVP 1075). Various additional Tylosaurus specimens informed minor missing body parts such as the hind limbs. The resulting animal was correctly depicted as a four-flipper reptile with a short neck and a tail making up around half the body length. Rather unrealistically, the vertebral column was drawn straight and lacking in structural curves that Tylosaurus would have possessed in life. Commentating on this issue, Everhart noted that Williston was already aware of the curvature of a mosasaur's spinal column and suggested that he had a straight spine drawn to save space on the plate the reconstruction was published on. Nevertheless, apart from the straight spine, Williston's century-old skeletal reconstruction of T. proriger is still considered accurate by modern standards, and adaptations of the skeleton remain in use by paleontologists and museum workers. In a review of the taxonomy of the Tylosaurus genus, Williston (1898) expressed doubt regarding the validity of T. micromus and T. nepaeolicus and went as far as to suggest the latter species was merely a juvenile representative of T. proriger. He also remarked that there exist little anatomical differences between T. proriger and T. dyspelor; the only real distinction between the two species being in size.

Discovered in Kansas by a local named W. O. Bourne and initially identified as T. dyspelor, the fossil has been considered remarkable in that it contained not only every bone apart from a few in the tail's tip, but also had exceptional preservation of the animal's soft tissue, including the larynx, trachea, bronchi, and cartilage in the throat, chest, and shoulders. This was due to calcification, a condition in a calcium-rich environment like the Kansas chalk that causes soft tissue to harden, allowing it to better fossilize. The completeness of AMNH FR 221 allowed Osborn to accurately measure the proportions of each body part; these ratios remain in use by modern paleontologists when extrapolating Tylosaurus fossils. Osborn (1899) included a life impression of AMNH FR 221 by paleoartist Charles R. Knight. The restoration carried a number of erroneous features, such as a baggy throat, bloated belly, and inaccurate paddles and dorsal fin. But a seminal feature was the addition of a dorsal crest (known as a fringe) lining the mosasaur's back. This was based on another 1898 description of a mosasaur fossil by Williston that erroneously identified tracheal rings as remains of a dorsal fringe, which he corrected in 1902. Knight updated his Tylosaurus restorations with the dorsal fringes removed to reflect this correction. However, his original depiction of a fringe was picked up as a meme, and many subsequent illustrations of the mosasaur continued to portray this inaccuracy.

Additional largely complete skeletons of T. proriger and T. dyspelor were uncovered from the Niobrara Formation between the 1900s to 1920s by Charles Sternberg and his son George, which were sold to museums in the United States and Germany. A particular find was a T. proriger skeleton collected by C. Sternberg from Smoky Hill Chalk deposits in Logan County, Kansas in 1917, which contained digested remains of a plesiosaur within its ribcage. The specimen was sold the following year to the Smithsonian, and the mosasaur has been permanently displayed as USNM 8898. The plesiosaur remains, despite their significance, were stashed as a separate specimen and promptly forgotten until their redescription by Everhart in 2004. This rediscovery formed the basis for the plot of the 2007 National Geographic film Sea Monsters: A Prehistoric Adventure. George Sternberg attempted to sell another complete T. proriger skeleton he found to the Smithsonian 1926, but the museum was satisfied with his father's earlier specimen and declined the offer. This skeleton was ultimately transferred to the Sternberg Museum as FHSM VP-3.

In his landmark 1967 work Systematics and Morphology of American Mosasaurs, Dale Russell performed a complete review and redescription of Tylosaurus. In a taxonomic examination, Russell found little justification for recognizing the validity of T. dyspelor and declared it a nomem vanum, along with recognizing T. micromus as a junior synonym of T. proriger. Many of the complete skeletons formerly assigned to the former taxon were reassigned to the type species. T. nepaeolicus was affirmed as a distinct species. Russell (1967) provided extensive diagnoses of Tylosaurus that are still used by scientists today, and Everhart remarked that the work "remains the single best reference regarding the skeletons of the various mosasaur genera" like Tylosaurus.

Hainosaurus and additional species

By Russell (1967), the only recognized valid species of Tylosaurus were T. proriger and T. nepaeolicus. However, throughout the 19th and 20th centuries, numerous species of mosasaurs were described from around the world that are now recognized within the genus Tylosaurus. These additional species were identified as different genera during their times of discovery and it was not until the early 21st century when they were reclassified as Tylosaurus.

In 1885, Louis Dollo described the genus Hainosaurus from a near-complete but poorly preserved skeleton excavated from a phosphate quarry in the Ciply Basin near the town of Mesvin, Belgium. The fossil was initially discovered as eight vertebrae by a worker in the January of the same year, who sold them to the Royal Belgian Institute of Natural Sciences. Based on information about the circumstances and locality of the discovery given the museum, it was recognized that the rest of the skeleton may have remained intact. In February, excavations were made under the authorization of an industrialist named Leopold Bernard, who managed the quarry the fossil resided in. The skeleton went to the museum, which was subsequently studied by Dollo, who recognized that it belonged to a new type of mosasaur. By instruction of the museum, he named it Hainosaurus bernardi. The prefix Haino- in the generic name refers to the Haine, a river located nearby the Ciply Basin, and thus combined with  means "lizard from the Haine"; Dollo wrote that this was erected specifically to complement the etymology of Mosasaurus, which was similarly named in reference to a river near its type locality. The specific epithet bernardi was in recognition of Bernard, who made the excavation of the skeleton possible. The skeleton is now on display at the Royal Belgian Institute under the catalog number IRSNB R23.

A second species historically pertained to Hainosaurus was described by in 1988 by Elizabeth Nicholls based on a partial skeleton consisting of a partial skull, lower jaw, a near-complete vertebral column, and some limb bones recovered from the Pembina Member of the Pierre Shale in Manitoba, Canada. This skeleton resides in the Miami Museum in Miami, Manitoba cataloged as MT 2. Although Hainosaurus was previously only known in Europe, Nicholls (1988) argued that the new species differed from the more locally known Tylosaurus based on a higher count of pygal vertebrae, longer external nares, and femur longer than the humerus. The species was named Hainosaurus pembinensis, the specific epithet referring to the Pembina Member the skeleton was found in.

In 2005, paleontologist Johan Lindgren suspected that Hainosaurus pembinensis was actually a species of Tylosaurus but stated that a better description of MT 2 was needed to be certain. In 2010, paleontologists Timon Bullard and Michael Caldwell redescribed such specimen. They argued that the pygal vertebrae reported by Nicholls (1988) actually belonged to another individual mosasaur, reducing the vertebral count in MT 2 to one that was indistinguishable with Tylosaurus. They also noted that the length of the external nares was within the known range of Tylosaurus and additionally argued that the femur being longer than the humerus was an insufficient characteristic to diagnose the species at the generic level. Based on these and other characteristics, the study found that the species cannot be referred to Hainosaurus and renamed it to Tylosaurus pembinensis. With this rediagnosis, the study also noted that the only confirmed characteristic that distinguished Hainosaurus from Tylosaurus at the time was a higher count of pygal vertebrae. It was doubted as to if this would be sufficient enough for Hainosaurus to be a distinct genus but acknowledged that further research may provide additional characteristics. This further research was done in 2016 by Paulina Jimenez-Huidobro and Caldwell, which reexamined H. bernardi. They found that the unique characteristics of the type species are indeed insufficient to warrant a distinction between Hainosaurus and Tylosaurus and declared the former as a junior synonym of the latter, thus renaming H. bernardi to Tylosaurus bernardi. However, some scientists argue that Hainosaurus should remain a distinct genus, justified by differences in tooth morphology unexplored by Jimenez-Huidobro & Caldwell (2016) such as the presence of an advanced cutting-based dentition in T. bernardi as opposed to a more general smashing-based dentition seen in other Tylosaurus species.

In 1896, paleontologist Armand Thevenin published a formal description of a poorly-preserved skull consisting of the majority of the maxilla, premaxilla, and dentary bones that was found in a phosphate deposit in Eclusier-Vaux, France during an earlier unspecified date. Thevenin wrote that the skull was first described by Jean Albert Gaudry, who initially thought that it belonged to a species of Liodon. However, Dollo thought that the characteristics of skull supported an alternative placement as a species of Mosasaurus. Through correspondence with Dollo and a reexamination of the skull, Thevenin noted that the rostrum was more elongated than those found in typical Mosasaurus skulls but not as long as those in the skulls of Tylosaurus or Hainosaurus. He suggested that this represented an intermediate trait for a new species, which he subsequently named Mosasaurus gaudryi; the specific epithet recognizing Gaudry's previous work on the fossil skull. The skull is now on display at the French National Museum of Natural History as MNHN 1896–15. In 1990, paleontologist Theagarten Lingham-Soliar proposed reassignment of M. gaudryi to a possible species of H. bernardi based on the discovery of a double buttress supporting the suture between the premaxilla and maxilla in MNHN 1896–15, a trait he claimed that was unique to the latter species, and estimations that the rostrum may have been more elongated than preserved. This was elaborated on a publication of the same year by Nathalie Bardet of the Natural History Museum, who concluded that MNHN 1896-15 belongs to the genus Hainosaurus but as a separate species, thus changing the skull's scientific name to Hainosaurus gaudryi. This was agreed on by Lingham-Soliar in a 1992 publication. In 2005, Lindgren pointed out that the characteristics used to justify the placement in Hainosaurus, such as the double buttress, can also be found in Tylosaurus. He also noted that the dentition of MNHN 1896-15 morphologically overlaps more with T. ivoensis and T. pembinensis than H. bernardi. With these characteristics, Lindgren concluded that H. gaudryi is most certainly a species of Tylosaurus, renaming it to Tylosaurus gaudryi.

In 1963, paleontologist Per Ove Persson identified a new taxon of mosasaur based on isolated teeth from a deposit located in an area called Ivö Klack near Ivö Lake in the Kristianstad Basin in Scania, Sweden. Such teeth and various other teeth pertaining to the same taxon were recovered and described from this area numerous times in the past since 1836, but they have always been misidentified as either an ichthyosaur or Mosasaurus hoffmannii. Persson proposed that the teeth belonged to a new subspecies of M. hoffmannii and gave it the name Mosasaurus hoffmannii ivoensis, the prefix ivo- in the species name referring to Ivö Klack. Russell (1967) amended this identification by elevating the taxon to a distinct species. He also identified a mosasaur fossil from the Niobrara Formation in Kansas consisting of a partial skull, some vertebrae, and a coracoid bone as being of Mosasaurus ivoensis. In an abstract presented in 1998, Lindgren doubted if M. ivoensis was a species of Mosasaurus. He instead proposed that the species was actually of Hainosaurus. The next year in 1999, Lindgren amended this in another abstract and instead suggested that the species should be moved to Tylosaurus. In 2002, he co-authored a study with paleontologist Mikael Siversson which examined the fossils referred to the species as well as new material consisting of pterygoid teeth, partial jawbones, and some vertebrae. It was found that the Niobrara fossil identified as M. ivoensis by Russell (1967) is actually of a different species. Examinations of the Swedish teeth found possible similarities with that of Taniwhasaurus, but due to the poor representation of the genus and the sheer distance between the two taxa (Taniwhasaurus was primarily known from New Zealand at the time), it was expressed that it is unlikely that M. ivoensis belongs to it. Instead, the study concluded that the species should belong to Tylosaurus and thus renamed it Tylosaurus ivoensis. However, a 2008 study led by Caldwell discovered Taniwhasaurus in northern Japan, which was of similar latitude with Ivö Klack during the Cretaceous, and reasserted dental similarities between T. ivoensis and the genus. This opened the possibility that the species could be reassigned to Taniwhasaurus, but the authors considered this to be a topic for a different study.

In 1964, Miguel Telles Antunes described Mosasaurus iembeensis from a partial skull excavated from the Itombe Formation near the town of Iembe, Angola. The deposit was initially dated to the Turonian age but this was later revised to about 88 mya during the later Coniacian. In 1992, Lingham-Soliar argued that the features of the skull disagreed with those of Mosasaurus and were instead characteristic of Tylosaurus. He subsequently moved the species into the genus, becoming Tylosaurus iembeensis. However, Lingham-Soliar did not figure the holotype skull, which he identified as residing in the collections of NOVA University Lisbon without a catalog number, and it was later reported in 2006 that the specimen may have been lost during a fire. In a 2012 multi-author study led by Octávio Mateus, it was reported that an additional T. iembeensis fossil consisting of fragmentary skull elements was recovered during an expedition to the lost holotype's locality, although the specimen was not figured or formally described.

21st century developments

In the 1990s, a well-preserved mosasaur skull of uncertain identity, which was discovered in an outcrop of the Niobrara Formation in the northwestern part of Ellis County, Kansas in 1968 and cataloged in the Sternberg Museum as FHSM VP-2295, was recognized by multiple authors as being a new species of Tylosaurus. Despite such recognition, however, no paleontologist investigated this further and the fossil remained undescribed during the remainder of the 20th century. In a 2004 meeting, Everhart suggested that the new species should finally be given a scientific name and formal description, to which paleontologist Louis L. Jacobs responded with "Well, get it done." In 2005, Everhart published a formal description of the new species represented by FHSM VP-2295. Thirteen different Tylosaurus specimens also from Kansas were identified as conspecific with FHSM VP-2295, and in reference to their shared localities the new species was given the name Tylosaurus kansasensis. However, during a 2007 meeting, Caldwell approached Everhart and suggested that his description of T. kansasensis was not adequate enough and should be readdressed in a followup paper. In 2013, Caldwell and Jiménez-Huidobro presented an abstract at the annual Society of Vertebrate Paleontology meeting casting doubt on the distinction of the species from T. nepaeolicus and in 2016 the two and paleontologist Tiago Simões published a study arguing that T. kansasensis was merely a juvenile form of T. nepaeolicus, thus making the former a junior synonym of the latter. This was criticized by Everhart, who in his 2017 book Oceans of Kansas claimed that the study was "poorly researched and written". However, he did not provide any comments on the topic, claiming that such would merely be considered "sour grapes". Nevertheless, Everhart maintained that T. kansasensis remains a distinct species "until proven otherwise". A 2018 study by Robert F. Stewart and Jordan Mallon also rejected the synonymy based on inconsistencies when comparing the ontogenetic trends of T. kansasensis and T. nepaeolicus between the better-understood T. proriger. Another ontogenetic study published in 2020 by Amelia R. Zietlow came in support of the synonymy based on results from ontograms constructed from a cladistical analysis.

In 1995, the Royal Saskatchewan Museum excavated a partial skeleton first discovered a year prior by a local farmer from a hill located northwest of Herbert Ferry, Saskatchewan. The skeleton was found articulated and consists of a "moderately complete" skull, a largely complete vertebral column, limb bones, and bones of a smaller mosasaur as stomach content; it was curated into the museum as RSM P2588.1 and nicknamed "Omācīw" (meaning "hunter" in Cree). In 2006, Timon Bullard of the University of Alberta studied the specimen in his Master of Science thesis. At the time, the Omācīw fossil was still in preparation and Bullard was only able to examine the right side of the skull. However, he identified that the fossil represented a new species of Tylosaurus and suggested that it be named Tylosaurus saskatchewanensis in reference to its type locality. Bullard's thesis was never published but subsequently published studies recognized T. saskatchewanensis as a valid species despite technically never having been formally described. In 2018, Bullard co-authored a multi-author study led by Jiménez-Huidobro which formally described Omācīw, which by then was more fully prepared, and confirmed its identity as a distinct species.

In 2020, the MS thesis of Samuel Garvey of the University of Cincinnati was published. The thesis focused on TMP 2014.011.0001, a Tylosaurus fossil in the collections of the Royal Tyrrell Museum consisting of a partial snout and a fragment of the right mandible. Moreover, the morphology of TMP 2014.011.0001 was recognized as very distinct from other Tylosaurus species. For example, it exhibited paedomorphosis in its teeth, which were slender and designed for piercing prey (contrary to the more robust cutting-specialized teeth of typical Tylosaurus species), a trait likely retained from juveniles. The uniqueness of the specimen led to the conclusion that it was a new species, which Garvey subsequently proposed that it be named Tylosaurus borealis in reference to its northernly occurrence.

Description
A distinguishing characteristic of Tylosaurus is the elongated conical rostrum that protrudes from its snout, from which the genus is named. Unlike typical mosasaurs, Tylosaurus did not have teeth up to the end of the snout nor on the bony protuberance that is the rostrum, and scientists believe that this feature was primarily used for combative purposes such as ramming. This is supported with a uniquely broad and somewhat rectangular internarial bar (the extension of the premaxilla on the top of the skull that held together the nasal and upper jaws) that provided high cranial stability and resistance to stress forces. In addition, the development of the elongated rostrum in infant Tylosaurus rules out the alternative explanation that it was developed as a function of sexual behavior. Tylosaurus also had 24 to 26 teeth in the upper jaw, 20 to 22 teeth on the palate, 26 teeth on the lower jaw, 29 to 30 vertebrate between the skull and hip, 6 to 7 vertebrae in the hip, 33 to 34 vertebrae in the tail with chevrons, and a further 56 to 58 vertebrae making up the tip of the tail.

Size

Tylosaurus was one of the largest mosasaurs of all time. The genus exhibits Cope's rule, in which its body size has been observed to generally increase over geologic time. Other species of Tylosaurus were smaller.

Commenting on the maximum sizes of large mosasaurs, paleontologist Mike Everhart, a leading expert on mosasaurs, speculated that it would be possible for some extremely old Tylosaurus individuals to reach  in absolute maximum length. However, this is with awareness that there is no fossil evidence suggesting such sizes and that the odds of preserving such a rare individual are "far too great."

However, the skeleton was assembled for display prior to a 2010 reassessment of the species that found its original number of vertebrae to be exaggerated, implying that the actual size of the animal was likely smaller.

Skin and coloration

Fossil evidence of the skin of Tylosaurus in the form of scales has been described since the late 1870s. These scales were small and diamond-shaped and were arranged in oblique rows, comparable to that found in modern rattlesnakes and other related reptiles. However, the scales in the mosasaur were much smaller in proportion to the whole body. Each scale was keeled in a form resembling that of a shark's denticles, suggesting that they functioned in reducing underwater drag.

Microscopic analysis of 86 million-year-old fossil scales of a T. nepaeolicus in a 2014 study detected high traces of the pigment eumelanin, indicating that the species possessed a dark coloration similar to the leatherback sea turtle in life. This may have also been complemented with countershading, which is present in many aquatic animals, but the distribution of dark and light pigments in the species remains unknown. In addition, the presence of keeled scales in the genus would have reduced reflection on the skin. A dark-colored form would have provided several evolutionary advantages for Tylosaurus. Dark coloration increases absorption of heat, allowing the animal to maintain elevated body temperatures in colder environments. Possession of this trait during infancy would in turn facilitate fast growth rates. Additionally, unreflective dark coloring and countershading would have provided the mosasaur with increased camouflage. Several speculative functions have also been proposed, such as increased tolerance to solar UV radiation, strengthened integuments, and increased aggressiveness (certain genes that code for high melanin may also have side influences promoting this trait).

Classification

Taxonomy

As a mosasaur, Tylosaurus is classified within the family Mosasauridae in the superfamily Mosasauroidea. The genus is the type genus of its own subfamily, the Tylosaurinae. Other members of this group include Taniwhasaurus and possibly Kaikaifilu, and the subfamily is defined by a shared feature of an elongated conical rostrum that does not bear teeth. The closest relatives of the Tylosaurinae include the Plioplatecarpinae and the primitive subfamilies Tethysaurinae and Yaguarasaurinae; together they are members of one of three possible major lineages of mosasaurs (the others being the Mosasaurinae subfamily and Halisauromorpha group) that was first recognized in 1993. This clade was named the Russellosaurina by Polcyn and Bell in 2005.

Tylosaurus was among the earliest known derived mosasaurs. The oldest fossil attributed to the genus is of a skull (SGM-M1) recovered from Upper Turonian deposits of Ojinaga Formation in Chihuahua, Mexico, which may date around 90 million years old at earliest based on correlations with index fossils. This skull has been identified as an indeterminate species with significant affinities with T. kansasensis, which was previously considered the most primitive species. A tooth from a Late Maastrichtian deposit in Nasiłów, Poland dating close to the Cretaceous–Paleogene boundary has been attributed to Hainosaurus sp. With the incorporation of Hainosaurus as a synonym of Tylosaurus, this also makes the genus one of the last mosasaurs. Currently, eight species of Tylosaurus are recognized by scientists as taxonomically valid. They are as follow: T. proriger, T. nepaeolicus, T. bernardi, T. gaudryi, T. ivoensis, T. iembeensis, T. pembinensis, and T. saskatchewanensis. The validity of two additional taxa remain unsettled; there is still debate whether T. kansasensis is synonymous with T. nepaeolicus, and T. borealis has yet to be described in a formal publication.

Phylogeny and evolution
In 2020, Madzia and Cau performed a Bayesian analysis to better understand the evolutionary influence on early mosasaurs by contemporaneous pliosaurs and polycotylids by examining the rates of evolution in mosasauroids like Tylosaurus (specifically T. proriger, T. nepaeolicus, and T. bernardi). A Bayesian analysis in the study's implementation can approximate numerically-defined rates of morphological evolution and ages of divergence of clades. The Tylosaurinae was approximated to have diverged from the Plioplatecarpinae around 93 million years ago; the divergence was characterized by the highest rate of evolution among all mosasaurid lineages. This trend of rapid evolution coincided with the extinction of the pliosaurs and a decrease in polycotylid diversity. The study noted converging traits between Tylosaurus, pliosaurs, and some polycotylids in tooth morphology and body size. However, there was no evidence to suggest that Tylosaurus or its precursors evolved as a result of out-competing and/or driving to extinction the pliosaurs and polycotylids. Instead, Madiza and Cau proposed that Tylosaurus may have taken advantage of the extinction of the pliosaurs and decline of polycotylids to quickly fill the ecological void they left behind. The Bayesian analysis also approximated a divergence of T. nepaeolicus from the rest of the genus around 86.88 million years ago and a divergence between T. proriger and T. bernardi around 83.16 million years ago. The analysis also generated a paraphyletic status of the genus, approximating Taniwhasaurus to have diverged from Tylosaurus around 84.65 million years ago, but this result is not consistent with previous phylogenetic analyses.

In the Western Interior Seaway, two species—T. nepaeolicus and T. proriger—represent a chronospecies, in which they make up a single lineage that continuously evolves without branching off in a process known as anagenesis. This is evident by how the two species do not stratigraphically overlap, are sister species, share minor and intermediate morphological differences such as a gradual change in the development of the quadrate bone, and lived in the same locations. The means by which this lineage evolved has been hypothesized to be through one of two evolutionary mechanisms related to changes in ontogeny. First, Jiménez-Huidobro, Simões, and Caldwell proposed in 2016 that T. proriger evolved as a paedomorph of T. nepaeolicus, in which the descendant arose as a result of morphological changes through the retention of juvenile features of the ancestor in adulthood. This was based on the presence of a frontal crest and convex borders of the parietal bone of the skull shared in both juvenile T. nepaeolicus and all T. proriger but lost in adult T. nepaeolicus. However, an ontogenetic study by Zietlow (2020) found that it was unclear whether this observation was a result of paedomorphosis, although this uncertainty may have been due that the sample size of mature T. nepaeolicus was too low to determine statistical significance. Second, the same study proposed an alternative hypothesis of peramorphosis, in which T. proriger evolved by developing traits found in mature T. nepaeolicus during immaturity. Based on results from a cladistical ontogram developed using data from 74 Tylosaurus specimens, the study identified a multitude of traits that were present in all T. proriger and mature T. nepaeolicus but absent in juvenile T. nepaeolicus: the skull size and depth are large, the length of the elongated rostrum exceeds 5% of the total skull length, the quadrate suprastapedial processes are thick, the overall quadrate shape converges, and the posteroventral process is fan-like.

The following cladogram is modified from a phylogenetic analysis by Jiménez-Huidobro & Caldwell (2019) using Tylosaurus species with sufficiently known material to model accurate relationships; T. gaudryi, T. ivoensis, and T. iembeensis were too poorly understood to be added into the analysis.

Paleobiology

Growth 

This suggests that Tylosaurus acquired the snout projection rapidly at an early stage in life, and also suggests that it did not develop due to sexual selection. Konishi and colleagues suggested a function in ramming prey, as employed by the modern orca.

Metabolism

Nearly all squamates are characterized by their cold-blooded ectothermic metabolism, but mosasaurs like Tylosaurus are unique in that they were likely endothermic, or warm-blooded. The only other known lizard with such a trait is the Argentine black and white tegu, though only partially. Endothermy in Tylosaurus was demonstrated in a 2016 study by Harrell, Pérez‐Huerta, and Suarez by examining δ18O isotopes in Tylosaurus bones. δ18O levels can be used to calculate the internal body temperature of animals, and by comparing such calculated temperatures between coexisting cold-blooded and warm-blooded animals, the type of metabolism can be inferred. The study used the body temperatures of the cold-blooded fish Enchodus and sea turtle Toxochelys (correlated with ocean temperatures) and warm-blooded seabird Ichthyornis from the Mooreville Chalk as a proxy. This was much higher than the body temperature of Enchodus and Toxochelys ( and  respectively) and similar to that of Ichthyornis. Harrell, Pérez‐Huerta, and Suarez also calculated the body temperatures of Platecarpus and Clidastes with similar numbers,  and  respectively. The fact that the other mosasaurs were much smaller in size than Tylosaurus and yet maintained similar body temperatures made it unlikely that Tylosauruss body temperature was the result of another metabolic type like gigantothermy. Endothermy would have provided several advantages to Tylosaurus such as increased stamina for foraging larger areas and pursuing prey, the ability to access colder waters, and better adaptation to withstand the gradual cooling of global temperatures during the Late Cretaceous.

Mobility

Scientists previously interpreted Tylosaurus as an anguilliform swimmer that moved by undulating its entire body like a snake due to its close relationship with the animal. However, it is now understood that Tylosaurus actually used carangiform locomotion, meaning that the upper body was less flexible and movement was largely concentrated at the tail like in mackerels. A BS thesis by Jesse Carpenter published in 2017 examined the vertebral mobility of T. proriger spinal columns and found that the dorsal vertebrae were relatively rigid but the cervical, pygal, and caudal vertebrae were more liberal in movement, indicating flexibility in the neck, hip, and tail regions. This contrasted with more derived mosasaurs like Plotosaurus, whose vertebral column was stiff up to the hip. Interestingly, an examination of a juvenile T. proriger found that its cervical and dorsal vertebrae were much stiffer than those in adult specimens. This may have been an evolutionary adaptation among young individuals; a more rigid tail-based locomotion is associated with faster speed, and this would allow vulnerable juveniles to better escape predators or catch prey. Older individuals would see their spine grow in flexibility as predator evasion becomes less important for survival.

Tylosaurus likely specialized as an ambush predator. It was lightweight for a mosasaur of its size, having a morphological build designed to vastly reduce body mass and density. Its pectoral and pelvic girdles and paddles, which are associated with weight, are proportionally small. Its bones were highly cancellous and were likely filled with fat cells in life, which also increased buoyancy. It is unlikely that the latter trait was evolved in response to increasing body size as the similarly-sized Mosasaurus hoffmannii lacked highly cancellous bone. These traits allowed Tylosaurus to be more conservative in its energy requirements, which is useful when traveling between ambush sites over large distances or through stealth. In addition, a reduced body density likely helped Tylosaurus to rapidly accelerate during an attack, assisted with the long and powerful tail of the mosasaur.

A 1988 study by Judith Massare attempted to calculate the sustained swimming speed, the speed at which the animal moves without tiring, of Tylosaurus through a series of mathematical models incorporating hydrodynamic characteristics and estimations of locomotive efficiency and metabolic costs. However, when testing whether the models represented an accurate framework, they were found to exaggerated. This was primarily because the variables accounting for drag may have been underestimated; estimation of drag coefficients for an extinct species can be difficult as it requires a hypothetical reconstruction of the morphological dimensions of the animal. Massare predicted that the actual sustained swimming speed of Tylosaurus was somewhere near half the calculated speed. The mathematical framework was subsequently corrected and modified for accuracy in 2002 by Ryosuke Motani, but Tylosaurus was not examined in the study.

Feeding 

One of the largest marine carnivores of its time, Tylosaurus was an apex predator that exploited the wide variety of marine fauna in its ecosystem. Stomach contents are well documented in the genus, which includes other mosasaurs, plesiosaurs, turtles, birds, bony fish, and sharks. Additional evidence from bite marks suggests the animal also preyed on giant squid and ammonites.

Puncture marks on fossils of ammonites, the carapace of a Protostega, and the gladius of an Enchoteuthis have been attributed to Tylosaurus.

Pasch and May (2001) reported bite marks from a dinosaur skeleton known as the Talkeetna Mountains Hadrosaur, which was found in marine strata of the Turonian-age Matanuska Formation in Alaska. The features of these marks were found to closely match that of the teeth of T. proriger. Because the fossil's locality was of marine deposits, the study reasoned that the dinosaur must have drifted offshore as a bloat-and-float carcass that was subsequently scavenged by the mosasaur. It was unlikely that the marks were a result of predation, as that would have led to a puncture, preventing the buildup of the bloating gases that allowed the corpse to drift out to sea in the first place. Garvey (2020) criticized the lack of conclusive evidence to support this hypothesis and ruled out T. proriger as a possible culprit, given that the species did not appear until the Santonian and is exclusive to the Western Interior Seaway. However, close relatives did maintain a presence nearby, evidenced by fragmentary fossils of an indeterminate tylosaurine from Turonian deposits in the Russian Chukotsky District.

Social behavior

The behavior of Tylosaurus towards each other may have been mostly aggressive, evidenced by fossils with injuries inflicted by another of their own kind. Such remains were frequently reported by fossil hunters during the late 19th and early 20th centuries, but few examples reside as specimens in scientific collections. Many of these fossils consist of healed bite marks and wounds that are concentrated around or near the head region, implying that there were the result of non-lethal interaction, but the motives of such contact remain speculative. In 1993, Rothschild and Martin noted that some modern lizards affectionately bite their mate's head during courtship, which can sometimes result in injuries. Alternatively, they also observed that some males lizards also employ head-biting as territorial behavior against rivals in a show of dominance by grappling the head to turn over the other on its back. It is possible that Tylosaurus behaved in similar ways.

Lingham-Soliar (1992) mentioned the consideration that the use of the combat-oriented elongated rostrum of Tylosaurus was not exclusive to hunting and that it may have also been applied in sexual behavior through battles over female mates between males. However, the study observed the elongated rostrum was invariably present in all individuals regardless of sex, and subsequent studies by Konishi et al. (2018) and Zietlow (2020) confirmed this pattern. This would imply that sexual selection was not a driver in its evolution and instead refined through sex-independent means.

At least one fatal instance of intraspecific combat among Tylosaurus is documented. The skull roof and surrounding areas exhibit signs of trauma in the form of four massive gouges, and the dentary contains at least seven puncture wounds and gouges. In addition, FHSM VP-2295 suffered damage to the sclerotic ring, a detached quadrate, and an articulation of the cervical vertebrae at an unnatural angle of 40° to the skull's long axis. The pattern of preservation makes it unlikely that the condition of the vertebrae was a result of disturbances by scavengers and instead indicates damage caused by a violently twisted neck during life. In a reconstructed scenario, the larger Tylosaurus would have first attacked at an angle slightly below the left side of the victim's head. This impact would cause the victim's skull to roll to the right side, allowing the aggressor to sink its teeth into the skull roof and right lower jaw, the latter crushing the jawbone and causing further breaks of nearby bones such as the pterygoid, a break in the right eye, and the twisting of the jawbone outwards. This would subsequently cause the quadrate to detach from its position and the spinal cord to twist and sever at the skull's base, leading to a swift death.

Paleopathology
Examining 12 North American Tylosaurus skeletons and one T. bernardi skeleton, Rothschild and Martin (2005) identified evidence of avascular necrosis in every individual. For aquatic animals, this condition is often a result of decompression illness, which is caused when bone-damaging nitrogen bubbles build up in inhaled air that is decompressed either by frequent deep-diving trips or by intervals of repetitive diving and short breathing. The studied mosasaurs likely gained avascular necrosis through such behaviors, and given its invariable presence in Tylosaurus it is likely that deep or repetitive diving was a general behavioral trait of the genus. The study observed that between 3-15% of vertebrae in the spinal column of North American Tylosaurus and 16% of vertebrae in T. bernardi were affected by avascular necrosis. Carlsen (2017) considered it frugal to presume that Tylosaurus gained avascular necrosis because it lacked the necessary adaptations for deep or repetitive diving, noting that the genus had well-developed eardrums that could protect themselves from rapid changes in pressure.

Unnatural fusion of some vertebrae in the tail has been reported in some Tylosaurus skeletons. A variation of these fusions may concentrate near the end of the tail to form a single mass of multiple fused vertebrae called a "club tail." Rothschild and Everhart (2015) surveyed 23 North American Tylosaurus skeletons and one T. bernardi skeleton and found that five of the North American skeletons exhibited fused tail vertebrae. The condition was not found in T. bernardi, but this does not rule out its presence due to the low sample size. Vertebral fusion occurs when the bones remodel themselves after damage from trauma or disease. However, the cause of such events can vary between individuals and/or remain hypothetical. One juvenile specimen with the club tail condition was found with a shark tooth embedded in the fusion, which confirms that at least some cases were caused by infections inflicted by predator attacks. The majority of vertebral fusion cases in Tylosaurus were caused by bone infections, but some cases may have alternatively been caused by any type of joint disease such as arthritis. However, evidence of joint disease was rare in Tylosaurus when compared to mosasaurs such as Plioplatecarpus and Clidastes.

Notes

References

Cited books

External links 
Oceans of Kansas; includes much additional information and many illustrations and photographs of tylosaurines, including restorations and skeletons.
 E.D. Cope's original description of Macrosaurus proriger from western Kansas, with the published figure (1870) and recent photographs.

Apex predators
Russellosaurins
Mosasaurs of North America
Fossil taxa described in 1872
Turonian genus first appearances
Maastrichtian genus extinctions
Taxa named by Othniel Charles Marsh
Mooreville Chalk